Versailles is a chain of five Cuban cuisine restaurants in Los Angeles, California, USA. The first restaurant in this chain opened in 1981 in West Los Angeles, specifically in Culver City on Venice Blvd.

Description
Versailles serves dishes including "Moors and Christians" (as black beans with white rice are called), ropa vieja (a stringy beef stew), eastin lechón (suckling pig with sliced onions), as well as beef tongue, sautéed ox tail, halibut in garlic sauce, and roast chicken in Mojo sauce. The restaurant's "trademark" is the garlic sauce it serves on its shredded roast pork and chicken.

The Lonely Planet guide to California calls it "Country-style Cuban at its finest". In a guide to law schools, the Versailles near UCLA is called a favorite and restaurant critic Jonathan Gold wrote in Counter Intelligence that "everybody but me" adores the chicken, black beans, avocado salad and other offerings. TheResident Tourist guide calls it a "Cuban-cuisine dream of a local chain that is good and cheap.". Best Places Los Angeles describes several of the dishes as very good, and calls the chicken with garlic sauce a must, giving it two stars and noting "garlic lovers gather at Versailles, where they often wait in line for a table to order the signature Cuban chicken ... at this casual, dark, divish Havanah style restaurant ..." Meals are commonly served with rice, black beans and fried plantains.

British actress Helen Mirren described an ideal weekend in Los Angeles as going to the beach and having dinner at Versailles.

As of 2009 there were five locations including the original in Culver City on Venice Blvd., and additional branches in Los Angeles on La Cienega Boulevard, Encino, Manhattan Beach, and Universal City Citywalk. Manhattan Beach and Universal City locations were closed.

References

External links
 Official Website
 Cuban Food USA website

Cuban-American cuisine
Cuban restaurants
Restaurants in Los Angeles
Restaurants in Greater Los Angeles
Hispanic and Latino American culture in Los Angeles
Regional restaurant chains in the United States
Restaurants established in 1981
1981 establishments in California